Buzzard Roost Creek is a stream in Colbert County in the northwestern corner of the U.S. state of Alabama. It is a tributary of Bear Creek within Pickwick Lake.

References

Rivers of Colbert County, Alabama
Rivers of Alabama